Đurička Rijeka is a village in the municipality of Plav, Montenegro.

Demographics
According to the 2011 census, its population was 254.

References

Populated places in Plav Municipality
Albanian communities in Montenegro